Jo Yun-mi (born 22 May 1989) is a North Korean football player that plays for the North Korea women's national football team. She played in the 2012 Summer Olympics.

References

External links
Jo Yun-mi at Asian Games Incheon 2014

North Korean women's footballers
Olympic footballers of North Korea
1989 births
Living people
Footballers at the 2012 Summer Olympics
Asian Games medalists in football
Footballers at the 2010 Asian Games
Footballers at the 2014 Asian Games
North Korea women's international footballers
Asian Games gold medalists for North Korea
Asian Games silver medalists for North Korea
Women's association footballers not categorized by position
Medalists at the 2010 Asian Games
Medalists at the 2014 Asian Games